Xie Hexing (born 16 November 1985) is a Paralympian athlete from China competing mainly in T46 classification sprint events.

Xie represented his country at the 2012 Summer Paralympics in London, where he competed at two events, the 400 metre sprint and as a member of the men's 4 x 100m relay. He managed to make the finals of the 400 metre race, finishing in seventh overall. As part of the men's relay, Xie won a silver medal.

Personal history
Xie was born in Chenzhou, China. At the age of two he lost his right arm in an accident with a rice machine.

Notes

Paralympic athletes of China
Athletes (track and field) at the 2012 Summer Paralympics
Paralympic silver medalists for China
Living people
1985 births
Medalists at the 2012 Summer Paralympics
Chinese male sprinters
People from Chenzhou
Runners from Hunan
Paralympic medalists in athletics (track and field)